The following are the national records in Olympic weightlifting in Azerbaijan. Records are maintained in each weight class for the snatch lift, clean and jerk lift, and the total for both lifts by the Azerbaijan Weightlifting Federation (AAAF).

Current records

Men

Women

Historical records

Men (1998–2018)

Women (1998–2018)

References

External links
 AAAF web site
 Azerbaijani historical records – Men

Azerbaijan
Records
Olympic weightlifting
weightlifting